The Rich family was a noble family of England that held the peerage titles of Baron Rich, Earl of Warwick, Baron Kensington, Earl of Holland and Baronet Rich during a period spanning the 16th–18th centuries.

Family tree

References

External links
 The papers of the Rich family are held by the Folger Shakespeare Library, including genealogical records.

 
English families
Earls Court